In the Line of Duty (German: Im Banne der Pflicht) is a 1917 Austrian silent drama film directed by Jacob Fleck and Luise Fleck and starring Wilhelm Klitsch, Marie Marchal and Karl Baumgartner.

Cast
 Wilhelm Klitsch as Großbauer Weller 
 Marie Marchal as Katharina 
 Karl Baumgartner as Bettelmönch Augustin 
 Josef Reithofer as Friedner 
 Viktor Franz as Knecht Hans

References

Bibliography
 Robert Von Dassanowsky. Austrian Cinema: A History. McFarland, 2005.

External links

1917 Austro-Hungarian films
1917 films
Austrian silent feature films
Austrian drama films
Films directed by Jacob Fleck
Films directed by Luise Fleck
Austrian black-and-white films
1917 drama films
Austrian films based on plays
Films based on works by Ludwig Anzengruber
Silent drama films
1910s German-language films